Jitin Puthenchery (born 24 August 1989) is an Indian film actor and assistant director who work predominantly in the Malayalam film industry. He is the son of popular Malayalam lyricist and poet  Girish Puthenchery.

Life and career 
Jitin was born on 24 August 1989 as the elder son of Gireesh Puthenchery and Beena in karaparamba near Eranhipalam in Kozhikode district of kerala.  He completed his primary education at St. Joseph's Boys' High School Calicut and graduation at Bangalore University. He is married to Divya Mohanan, a software engineer.  His younger brother Din Nath is a lyricist and Assistant director

Jitin made his debut in the Malayalam film industry  as an assistant director in 2013 through Sudhir Ambalappad's  movie Breaking News Live.  He later worked as an assistant director in Matini, Koothara and Mani Ratnam.in 2016, he joined Farhan Akhtar-Riteish Sidwani team's Excel Entertainment, a Mumbai-based film production company, and later worked as a director's assistant on Farhan's Rock-On 2.

In 2016 he starred in his friend Dominic Arun's short film Mrityunjaya.  He later appeared in a small role in Dominic's Tovino movie Tharangam ,he  also worked as a co-writer and assistant director for Tharangam . Later he  was auditioned for Shankar Ramakrishnan's debut movie Pathinettam Padi  in which he played the role of a state school student named giri and he was notable for portraying the character.

He later starred in popular Malayalam director  Kamal's movie Pranaya Meenukalude Kadal  Tovino's  Edakkad Battalion and the Mohalal-Priyadarshan team's Maraikar Arabikadalinte Simham. in 2021 he won critical acclaim for his portrayal of the protagonist in Don Palathara's movie Santhoshathinte Onnam Rahasyam .

Filmography

References 

Male actors from Kozhikode
Male actors in Malayalam cinema
Indian male film actors
1989 births
Living people
21st-century Indian male actors